KK Bosna Royal history and statistics in FIBA Europe and Euroleague Basketball (company) competitions.

1970s

1974–75 FIBA Korać Cup, 3rd–tier
The 1974–75 FIBA Korać Cup was the 4th installment of the European 3rd-tier level professional basketball club competition FIBA Korać Cup, running from November 5, 1974, to March 25, 1975. The trophy was won by the title holder Birra Forst Cantù, who defeated CF Barcelona by a result of 181–154 in a two-legged final on a home and away basis. Overall, Bosna achieved in present competition a record of 5 wins against 5 defeats, in three successive rounds. More detailed:

First round
 Tie played on November 5, 1974, and on November 12, 1974.

|}

Second round
 Tie played on November 26, 1974, and on December 3, 1974.

|}

Top 16
 Tie played on January 7, 1975, and on January 14, 1975.

|}

 Tie played on January 21, 1975, and on January 28, 1975.

|}

 Tie played on February 5, 1975, and on February 12, 1975.

|}

 Group D standings:

1976–77 FIBA Korać Cup, 3rd–tier
The 1976–77 FIBA Korać Cup was the 6th installment of the European 3rd-tier level professional basketball club competition FIBA Korać Cup, running from October 19, 1976, to April 5, 1977. The trophy was won by Jugoplastika, who defeated Alco Bologna by a result of 87–84 at Palasport della Fiera in Genoa, Italy. Overall, Bosna achieved in present competition a record of 6 wins against 2 defeats, in three successive rounds. More detailed:

First round
 Tie played on October 19, 1976, and on October 26, 1976.

|}

Second round
 Tie played on November 16, 1976, and on November 23, 1976.

|}

Top 12
 Day 1 (January 11, 1977)

|}

 Day 2 (January 18, 1977)
Bye

 Day 3 (January 25, 1977)

|}

 Day 4 (February 8, 1977)

|}

 Day 5 (February 15, 1977)
Bye

 Day 6 (February 22, 1977)

|}

 Group B standings:

1977–78 FIBA Korać Cup, 3rd–tier
The 1977–78 FIBA Korać Cup was the 7th installment of the European 3rd-tier level professional basketball club competition FIBA Korać Cup, running from November 15, 1977, to March 21, 1978. The trophy was won by Partizan, who defeated Bosna by a result of 117–110 (OT) at Sportska dvorana Borik in Banja Luka, Yugoslavia. Overall, Bosna achieved in present competition a record of 7 wins against 4 defeats, in four successive rounds. More detailed:

First round
 Tie played on November 15, 1977, and on November 22, 1977.

|}
*İTÜ withdrew before the first leg, and Bosna received a forfeit (2-0) in both games.

Top 16
 Day 1 (December 13, 1977)

|}

 Day 2 (January 10, 1978)

|}

 Day 3 (January 17, 1978)

|}

 Day 4 (January 24, 1978)

|}

 Day 5 (January 31, 1978)

|}

 Day 6 (February 7, 1978)

|}

 Group B standings:

Semifinals
 Tie played on February 28, 1978, and on March 9, 1978.

|}

Final
 March 21, 1978 at Sportska dvorana Borik in Banja Luka, Yugoslavia.

|}
*Overtime at the end of regulation (101–101).

1978–79 FIBA European Champions Cup, 1st–tier
The 1978–79 FIBA European Champions Cup was the 22nd installment of the European top-tier level professional basketball club competition FIBA European Champions Cup (now called EuroLeague), running from November 2, 1978, to April 5, 1979. The trophy was won by Bosna, who defeated Emerson Varese by a result of 96–93 at Palais des Sports in Grenoble, France. Overall, Bosna achieved in the present competition a record of 13 wins against 4 defeats, in three successive rounds. More detailed:

First round
 Day 1 (November 2, 1978)

|}

 Day 2 (November 9, 1978)

|}

 Day 3 (November 16, 1978)

|}

 Day 4 (November 23, 1978)

|}

 Day 5 (November 30, 1978)

|}

 Day 6 (December 7, 1978)

|}

 Group E standings:

Semifinals
 Day 1 (January 10, 1979)

|}
*Overtime at the end of regulation (100–100).

 Day 2 (January 18, 1979)

|}

 Day 3 (January 25, 1979)

|}

 Day 4 (January 31, 1979)

|}

 Day 5 (February 7, 1979)

|}

 Day 6 (February 15, 1979)

|}

 Day 7 (March 1, 1979)

|}

 Day 8 (March 8, 1979)

|}

 Day 9 (March 15, 1979)

|}

 Day 10 (March 21, 1979)

|}

 Semifinals group stage standings:

Final
 April 5, 1979 at Palais des Sports in Grenoble, France.

|}

1980s

1979–80 FIBA European Champions Cup, 1st–tier
The 1979–80 FIBA European Champions Cup was the 23rd installment of the European top-tier level professional basketball club competition FIBA European Champions Cup (now called EuroLeague), running from November 11, 1979, to March 27, 1980. The trophy was won by Real Madrid, who defeated Maccabi Tel Aviv by a result of 89–85 at Deutschlandhalle in West Berlin, West Germany. Overall, Bosna achieved in the present competition a record of 9 wins against 5 defeats, in two successive rounds. More detailed:

First round
 Day 1 (October 11, 1979)
Bye

 Day 2 (October 18, 1979)

|}

 Day 3 (November 1, 1979)

|}

 Day 4 (November 8, 1979)
Bye

 Day 5 (November 22, 1979)

|}

 Day 6 (November 29, 1979)

|}

 Group A standings:

Semifinals
 Day 1 (December 13, 1979)

|}

 Day 2 (December 20, 1979)

|}

 Day 3 (January 10, 1980)

|}

 Day 4 (January 17, 1980)

|}

 Day 5 (January 24, 1980)

|}

 Day 6 (January 31, 1980)

|}

 Day 7 (February 14, 1980)

|}

 Day 8 (February 21, 1980)

|}

 Day 9 (March 5, 1980)

|}

 Day 10 (March 13, 1980)

|}

 Semifinals group stage standings:

1980–81 FIBA European Champions Cup, 1st–tier
The 1980–81 FIBA European Champions Cup was the 24th installment of the European top-tier level professional basketball club competition FIBA European Champions Cup (now called EuroLeague), running from October 9, 1980, to March 26, 1981. The trophy was won by Maccabi Tel Aviv, who defeated Sinudyne Bologna by a result of 80–79 at Hall Rhénus in Strasbourg, France. Overall, Bosna achieved in the present competition a record of 9 wins against 7 defeats, in two successive rounds. More detailed:

First round
 Day 1 (October 9, 1980)

|}

 Day 2 (October 16, 1980)

|}

 Day 3 (October 30, 1980)

|}

 Day 4 (November 6, 1980)

|}

 Day 5 (November 13, 1980)

|}

 Day 6 (November 20, 1980)

|}

 Group C standings:

Semifinals
 Day 1 (December 10, 1980)

|}

 Day 2 (December 18, 1980)

|}

 Day 3 (January 15, 1981)

|}

 Day 4 (January 22, 1981)

|}

 Day 5 (January 29, 1981)

|}

 Day 6 (February 5, 1981)

|}

 Day 7 (February 19, 1981)

|}

 Day 8 (February 26, 1981)

|}
*Overtime at the end of regulation (99–99).

 Day 9 (March 5, 1981)

|}

 Day 10 (March 12, 1981)

|}

 Semifinals group stage standings:

1983–84 FIBA European Champions Cup, 1st–tier
The 1983–84 FIBA European Champions Cup was the 27th installment of the European top-tier level professional basketball club competition FIBA European Champions Cup (now called EuroLeague), running from September 15, 1983, to March 29, 1984. The trophy was won by Banco di Roma, who defeated FC Barcelona by a result of 79–73 at Patinoire des Vernets in Geneva, Switzerland. Overall, Bosna achieved in the present competition a record of 9 wins against 5 defeats, in four successive rounds. More detailed:

First round
 Bye

Second round
 Tie played on September 29, 1983, and on October 6, 1983.

|}

Top 12
 Tie played on October 27, 1983, and on November 3, 1983.

|}

Semifinals
 Day 1 (December 8, 1983)

|}

 Day 2 (December 15, 1983)

|}

 Day 3 (January 12, 1984)

|}

 Day 4 (January 18, 1984)

|}

 Day 5 (January 26, 1984)

|}

 Day 6 (February 2, 1984)

|}

 Day 7 (February 16, 1984)

|}

 Day 8 (February 23, 1984)

|}

 Day 9 (February 29, 1984)

|}

 Day 10 (March 8, 1984)

|}

 Semifinals group stage standings:

1984–85 FIBA European Cup Winners' Cup, 2nd–tier
The 1984–85 FIBA European Cup Winners' Cup was the 19th installment of FIBA's 2nd-tier level European-wide professional club basketball competition FIBA European Cup Winners' Cup (lately called FIBA Saporta Cup), running from October 2, 1984, to March 19, 1985. The trophy was won by FC Barcelona, who defeated Žalgiris by a result of 77–73 at Palais des Sports in Grenoble, France. Overall, Bosna achieved in the present competition a record of 1 win against 1 defeat, in two successive rounds. More detailed:

First round
 Bye

Top 16
 Tie played on October 30, 1984, and on November 6, 1984.

|}

1985–86 FIBA Korać Cup, 3rd–tier
The 1985–86 FIBA Korać Cup was the 15th installment of the European 3rd-tier level professional basketball club competition FIBA Korać Cup, running from October 2, 1985, to March 27, 1986. The trophy was won by Banco di Roma, who defeated Mobilgirgi Caserta by a result of 157–150 in a two-legged final on a home and away basis. Overall, Bosna achieved in present competition a record of 3 wins against 3 defeats, in three successive rounds.

First round
 Bye

Second round
 Bye

Top 16
 Day 1 (December 4, 1985)

|}
*Overtime at the end of regulation (84–84).

 Day 2 (December 11, 1985)

|}

 Day 3 (January 8, 1986)

|}

 Day 4 (January 15, 1986)

|}

 Day 5 (January 22, 1986)

|}

 Day 6 (January 29, 1986)

|}

 Group C standings:

1990s

1989–90 FIBA Korać Cup, 3rd–tier
The 1989–90 FIBA Korać Cup was the 19th installment of the European 3rd-tier level professional basketball club competition FIBA Korać Cup, running from September 27, 1989, to March 28, 1990. The trophy was won by Ram Joventut, who defeated Scavolini Pesaro by a result of 195–184 in a two-legged final on a home and away basis. Overall, Bosna achieved in present competition a record of 10 wins against 3 defeats plus 1 draw, in five successive rounds. More detailed:

First round
 Tie played on September 27, 1989, and on October 4, 1989.

|}

Second round
 Tie played on October 25, 1989, and on November 1, 1989.

|}

Top 16
 Day 1 (December 6, 1989)

|}

 Day 2 (December 13, 1989)

|}

 Day 3 (January 17, 1990)

|}
*Overtime at the end of regulation (80–80).

 Day 4 (January 24, 1990)

|}

 Day 5 (January 31, 1990)

|}

 Day 6 (February 7, 1990)

|}

 Group A standings:

Quarterfinals
 Tie played on February 21, 1990, and on February 28, 1990.

|}

Semifinals
 Tie played on March 7, 1990, and on March 15, 1990.

|}

1991–92 FIBA Korać Cup, 3rd–tier
The 1991–92 FIBA Korać Cup was the 21st installment of the European 3rd-tier level professional basketball club competition FIBA Korać Cup, running from October 2, 1991, to March 18, 1992. The trophy was won by il Messaggero Roma, who defeated Scavolini Pesaro by a result of 193–180 in a two-legged final on a home and away basis. Overall, Bosna achieved in present competition a record of 2 wins against 1 defeat plus 1 draw, in two successive rounds. More detailed:

First round
 Tie played on October 2, 1991, and on October 3, 1991.

|}

Second round
 Tie played on October 30, 1991, and on November 6, 1991.

|}

1995–96 FIBA Korać Cup, 3rd–tier
The 1995–96 FIBA Korać Cup was the 25th installment of the European 3rd-tier level professional basketball club competition FIBA Korać Cup, running from September 6, 1995, to March 13, 1996. The trophy was won by Efes Pilsen, who defeated Stefanel Milano by a result of 146–145 in a two-legged final on a home and away basis. Overall, Bosna achieved in present competition a record of 0 wins against 2 defeats, in only one rounds. More detailed:

First round
 Tie played on September 6, 1995, and on September 13, 1995.

|}
*Bosna withdrew before the first leg and Croatia Osiguranje received a forfeit (20-0) in both games.

1998–99 FIBA Saporta Cup, 2nd–tier
The 1998–99 FIBA Saporta Cup was the 33rd installment of FIBA's 2nd-tier level European-wide professional club basketball competition FIBA Saporta Cup, running from September 22, 1998, to April 13, 1999. The trophy was won by Benetton Treviso, who defeated Pamesa Valencia by a result of 64–60 at Pabellón Príncipe Felipe in Zaragoza, Spain. Overall, Bosna achieved in the present competition a record of 1 win against 9 defeats, in only one round. More detailed:

First round
 Day 1 (September 22, 1998)

|}

 Day 2, (September 30, 1998)

|}

 Day 3 (October 7, 1998)

|}

 Day 4 (October 13, 1998)

|}

 Day 5 (October 20, 1998)

|}

 Day 6 (November 3, 1998)

|}

 Day 7 (November 12, 1998)

|}

 Day 8 (November 17, 1998)

|}

 Day 9 (December 8, 1998)

|}

 Day 10 (December 15, 1998)

|}

 Group E standings:

2000s

1999–2000 FIBA Saporta Cup, 2nd–tier
The 1999–2000 FIBA Saporta Cup was the 34th installment of FIBA's 2nd-tier level European-wide professional club basketball competition FIBA Saporta Cup, running from September 21, 1999, to April 11, 2000. The trophy was won by AEK, who defeated Kinder Bologna by a result of 83–76 at Centre Intercommunal de Glace de Malley in Lausanne, Switzerland. Overall, Bosna achieved in the present competition a record of 4 wins against 8 defeats, in two successive rounds. More detailed:

First round
 Day 1 (September 21, 1999)

|}

 Day 2 (September 28, 1999)

|}

 Day 3 (October 5, 1999)

|}

 Day 4 (October 12, 1999)

|}

 Day 5 (October 19, 1999)

|}

 Day 6 (November 2, 1999)

|}

 Day 7 (November 9, 1999)

|}

 Day 8 (November 16, 1999)

|}

 Day 9 (December 7, 1999)

|}

 Day 10 (December 14, 1999)

|}

 Group D standings:

Second round
 Tie played on January 11, 2000, and on January 18, 2000.

|}

2007–08 ULEB Cup, 2nd–tier
The 2007–08 ULEB Cup was the 6th installment of ULEB's 2nd-tier level European-wide professional club basketball competition ULEB Cup (lately called EuroCup Basketball), running from November 6, 2007, to April 13, 2008. The trophy was won by DKV Joventut, who defeated Akasvayu Girona by a result of 79–54 at Palavela in Turin, Italy. Overall, Bosna achieved in the present competition a record of 5 wins against 7 defeats, in two successive rounds. More detailed:

Regular season
 Day 1 (November 6, 2007)

|}

 Day 2 (November 13, 2007)

|}

 Day 3 (November 20, 2007)

|}

 Day 4 (November 27, 2007)

|}

 Day 5 (December 4, 2007)

|}
*Longest game in the history of European competitions. Five (!) overtimes at the end of regulation (71–71, 82–82, 97–97, 111–111 and 122–122).

 Day 6 (December 11, 2007)

|}

 Day 7 (December 18, 2007)

|}

 Day 8 (January 9, 2008)

|}

 Day 9 (January 15, 2008)

|}

 Day 10 (January 22, 2008)

|}

 Group A standings:

Top 32
 Tie played on February 19, 2008, and on February 26, 2008.

|}

2010s

2010–11 FIBA EuroChallenge, 3rd–tier
The 2010–11 FIBA EuroChallenge was the 8th installment of FIBA's 3rd-tier level European-wide professional club basketball competition FIBA EuroChallenge, running from November 29, 2010, to May 1, 2011. The trophy was won by Krka, who defeated Lokomotiv Kuban by a result of 83–77 at Sleuyter Arena in Ostend, Belgium. Overall, Bosna achieved in the present competition a record of 0 wins against 2 defeats, in only one round. More detailed:

First round
 Tie played on September 29, 2010, and on October 5, 2010.

|}

2017–18 Basketball Champions League, 3rd–tier
The 2017–18 Basketball Champions League was the 2nd installment of FIBA's 3rd-tier level European-wide professional club basketball competition Basketball Champions League, running from September 19, 2017, to May 6, 2018. The trophy was won by AEK, who defeated Monaco by a result of 100–94 at O.A.C.A. Olympic Indoor Hall in Athens, Greece. Overall, Bosna Royal achieved in the present competition a record of 0 wins against 2 defeats, in only one round. More detailed:

First round
 Tie played on September 19, 2017, and on September 21, 2017.

|}

Eliminated teams of that round advanced in the regular season of the 2017–18 FIBA Europe Cup, the 4th–tier level European-wide professional basketball club competition.

2017–18 FIBA Europe Cup, 4th–tier
The 2017–18 FIBA Europe Cup was the 3rd installment of FIBA's 4th-tier level European-wide professional club basketball competition FIBA Europe Cup, running from September 20, 2017, to May 2, 2018. The trophy was won by Umana Reyer Venezia, who defeated Sidigas Avellino by a result of 158–148 in a two-legged final on a home and away basis. Overall, Bosna Royal achieved in the present competition a record of 0 wins against 6 defeats, in only one round. More detailed:

Regular season
 Day 1 (October 18, 2017)

|}

 Day 2 (October 25, 2017)

|}

 Day 3 (October 31, 2017)

|}

 Day 4 (November 8, 2017)

|}

 Day 5 (November 15, 2017)

|}

 Day 6 (December 6, 2017)

|}

 Group A standings:

Worldwide and other (semi-official) European competitions

1979 XIII FIBA Intercontinental Cup "William Jones"
The 1979 XIII FIBA Intercontinental Cup "William Jones" was the 13th installment of the FIBA Intercontinental Cup for men's professional basketball clubs, running from October 2, 1979, to October 6, 1979. It took place at Ginásio do Ibirapuera in São Paulo, Brazil. The trophy was won by Sírio.

League stage
 Day 1 (October 2, 1979)

|}
*Two overtimes at the end of regulation (92–92 and 105–105).

 Day 2 (October 3, 1979)
Bye

 Day 3 (October 4, 1979)

|}

 Day 4 (October 5, 1979)

|}

 Day 5 (October 6, 1979)

|}

 Final standings:

1980 XIV FIBA Intercontinental Cup "William Jones"
The 1980 XIV FIBA Intercontinental Cup "William Jones" was the 14th installment of the FIBA Intercontinental Cup for men's professional basketball clubs, running from October 1, 1980, to October 5, 1980. It took place at Sportska Dvorana Skenderija in Sarajevo, Yugoslavia. The trophy was won by Maccabi Tel Aviv.

League stage
 Day 1 (October 1, 1980)

|}

 Day 2 (October 2, 1980)

|}

 Day 3 (October 3, 1980)
Bye

 Day 4 (October 4, 1980)

|}

 Day 5 (October 5, 1980)

|}

 Final standings:

Record
KK Bosna Royal has overall, from 1974 to 1975 (first participation) to 2017–18 (last participation): 80 wins against 74 defeats plus 2 draws in 156 games for all the European club competitions.

 EuroLeague: 40–21 (61)
 FIBA Saporta Cup: 6–18 (24) /// EuroCup Basketball: 5–7 (12)
 FIBA Korać Cup: 31–18 plus 2 draws (51) /// FIBA EuroChallenge: 0–2 (2) /// Basketball Champions League: 0–2 (2)
 FIBA Europe Cup: 0–6 (6)

Also KK Bosna Royal has a 5–3 record in the FIBA Intercontinental Cup.

See also
 Yugoslav basketball clubs in European competitions

References

External links
FIBA Europe
EuroLeague
ULEB
EuroCup
Basketball Champions League
Fiba Europe Cup

KK Bosna Royal
Bosna